Lynsey Marie Bartilson (born July 1, 1983) is an American actress, dancer, and singer. She is best known for playing Lily Finnerty on the Fox/WB sitcom Grounded for Life, and voicing Tuesday X for the Nickelodeon TV series, The X's.

Biography
In 2002, Bartilson recorded "This Christmas I Will Give My Love to You" and "Rockin' Around the Christmas Tree" for School's Out! Christmas (2002).

Bartilson has been a member of the Church of Scientology since childhood, and is active in a number of Scientology-related organizations, such as Youth for Human Rights International. In October 2004, she was the Mistress of Ceremonies for the first annual "Youth for Human Rights Day International" in Los Angeles, appearing onstage with Leisa Goodman and other prominent Scientologists.

Filmography

Film

Television

References

External links

1983 births
Actresses from Minnesota
American child actresses
American film actresses
American Scientologists
American television actresses
American voice actresses
Living people
People from Edina, Minnesota
20th-century American actresses
21st-century American actresses